The 1982 Tournament Players Championship was a golf tournament on the PGA Tour, held March 18–21 at TPC Sawgrass in Ponte Vedra Beach, Florida, southeast of Jacksonville. It was the ninth Tournament Players Championship and the first at the new course.

Playing an orange ball, Jerry Pate shot a final round 67 (−5) to win by two strokes over runners-up Scott Simpson and Brad Bryant. Pate started the final round three strokes behind the leaders, in a tie for sixth place. Following his win, Pate pushed tour commissioner Deane Beman and course designer Pete Dye into the lake along the 18th green, and then joined them.

Notables to miss the cut included hall of famers Jack Nicklaus, Arnold Palmer, Gary Player and, Lee Trevino.

Defending champion Raymond Floyd finished eleven strokes back, in a tie for 22nd place.

Venue

This was the first Tournament Players Championship held at the TPC at Sawgrass Stadium Course; its 1982 setup measured . The debut was delayed a year due to heavy rains during construction.

Eligibility requirements 
All designated players
Winners of major TPA Tour co-sponsored or approved events beginning with the 1981 Tournament Players Championship and concluding with the tournament immediately preceding the 1982 TPC
The current British Open champion
Leaders in the TPA Tour Official Standings as necessary to complete the field, beginning with the 1981 TPC and concluding with the Bay Hill Classic, which concludes March 7, 1982

Source:

Field
John Adams, Buddy Allin, Isao Aoki, George Archer, Seve Ballesteros, Jim Barber, Miller Barber, Dave Barr, Beau Baugh, Andy Bean, Chip Beck, Woody Blackburn, Jim Booros, Bill Britton, Brad Bryant, George Burns, Bob Byman, George Cadle, Rex Caldwell, Bill Calfee, Bobby Clampett, Lennie Clements, Jim Colbert, Bobby Cole, Frank Conner, Charles Coody, John Cook, Fred Couples, Ben Crenshaw, Rod Curl, Jim Dent, Bruce Devlin, Terry Diehl, Mike Donald, Ed Dougherty, Bruce Douglass, Bob Eastwood, Danny Edwards, David Edwards, Dave Eichelberger, Lee Elder, Nick Faldo, Keith Fergus, Forrest Fezler, Ed Fiori, Bruce Fleisher, Raymond Floyd, Gibby Gilbert, Bob Gilder, David Graham, Lou Graham, Thomas Gray, Hubert Green, Jay Haas, Joe Hager, Gary Hallberg, Dan Halldorson, Phil Hancock, Morris Hatalsky, Mark Hayes, Vance Heafner, Jerry Heard, Skeeter Heath, Scott Hoch, Mike Holland, Joe Inman, Hale Irwin, Peter Jacobsen, Barry Jaeckel, Don January, Tom Jenkins, Grier Jones, Tom Kite, Billy Kratzert, Wayne Levi, Don Levin, Bruce Lietzke, Pat Lindsey, Lyn Lott, Mark Lye, John Mahaffey, Roger Maltbie, Rik Massengale, Terry Mauney, John Mazza, Gary McCord, Mike McCullough, Mark McCumber, Pat McGowan, Allen Miller, Johnny Miller, Jeff Mitchell, Gil Morgan, Mike Morley, Bob Murphy, Jim Nelford, Larry Nelson, Jack Nicklaus, Mike Nicolette, Lonnie Nielsen, Andy North, Mark O'Meara, Peter Oosterhuis, Arnold Palmer, Jerry Pate, Calvin Peete, Mark Pfeil, Gary Player, Dan Pohl, Don Pooley, Greg Powers, Tom Purtzer, Sammy Rachels, Victor Regalado, Mike Reid, Jack Renner, Chi-Chi Rodríguez, Bill Rogers, John Schroeder, Bob Shearer, Jim Simons, Scott Simpson, Tim Simpson, J. C. Snead, Sam Snead, Ed Sneed, Craig Stadler, Dave Stockton, Curtis Strange, Ron Streck, Mike Sullivan, Doug Tewell, Barney Thompson, Leonard Thompson, David Thore, Jim Thorpe, Lee Trevino, Gary Trivisonno, Howard Twitty, Tommy Valentine, Bobby Wadkins, Lanny Wadkins, Denis Watson, Tom Watson, D. A. Weibring, Tom Weiskopf, Fuzzy Zoeller

Round summaries

First round
Thursday, March 18, 1982

Source:

Second round
Friday, March 19, 1982
Saturday, March 20, 1982

Source:

Third round
Saturday, March 20, 1982

Source:

Final round
Sunday, March 21, 1982

Video
You Tube – Memorable Moments: The Players – PGA Tour

References

External links
The Players Championship website
Full Leaderboard
PGA Tour – Pate looks back on 30th anniversary of breakthrough at TPC Sawgrass

1982
1982 in golf
1982 in American sports
1982 in sports in Florida
March 1982 sports events in the United States